MPG: Motion Picture Genocide is a 1997 film (revised 2002) by Robert Banks. It is an examination of 100 years of African Americans being murdered in films.

External links
The Lantern
 

1997 films
1997 short films
American short documentary films
Documentary films about African Americans
Documentary films about the cinema of the United States
1990s short documentary films
1990s English-language films
1990s American films